Percy G. Foor (April 12, 1913 – September 13, 1990) was a Republican member of the Pennsylvania House of Representatives. He was born in Bedford County in 1913.

Formative years
Born on April 12, 1913 in Everett, Pennsylvania, Percy Foor was a son of Albert F. and Jennie Foor. A graduate of Everett High School, he grew up to become a realtor and the owner-operator of the Percy G. Foor Lumber Company.

Political career
A Republican, Foor was elected to, and served for ten years on, the board of directors of the Everett Southern Joint School District. Elected as justice of the peace in Everett in 1956, he served in that capacity until 1960.

Foor was then elected to the Pennsylvania House of Representatives in 1961. Representing the 78th District, he served constituents in Bedford, Fulton and Huntingdon counties for seven consecutive terms. Appointed to the Local Government Commission in 1967, he chaired that commission from 1969 to 1970 and from 1973 to 1974. He then completed his service with the commission in 1974.

Illness, death and interment
Foor died in a palliative care hospital on September 13, 1990, and was interred at the Everett Cemetery in Everett, Pennsylvania.

References

Republican Party members of the Pennsylvania House of Representatives
1913 births
1990 deaths
20th-century American politicians